Basilodes is a genus of owlet moths in the family Noctuidae. There are about six described species in Basilodes.

Species
These six species belong to the genus Basilodes:
 Basilodes aurata Schaus, 1911
 Basilodes chrysopis Grote, 1881
 Basilodes inquinatus Hogue, 1963
 Basilodes pepita Guenée, 1852 (gold moth)
 Basilodes philobia Druce, 1897
 Basilodes straminea Poole, 1995

References

 Basilodes at Markku Savela's Lepidoptera and Some Other Life Forms
 Natural History Museum Lepidoptera genus database

Stiriinae